USS Gary may refer to:

 , a destroyer escort, launched in 1943, transferred to the Royal Navy and renamed HMS Duckworth, and scrapped in 1946
 , a destroyer escort commissioned in 1943, renamed in 1945 to free up the name for the planned light cruiser and transferred to Tunisia in 1973
 , scheduled to be a light cruiser, but canceled prior to construction in 1945
 , a frigate, commissioned in 1984, decommissioned in 2015; subsequently transferred to Taiwan and renamed ROCS Feng Chia

United States Navy ship names